Evropa may refer to:
 Europe
 Evropa (album), a 2001 album by Serbian singer Stoja
 Evropa (magazine), a Serbian weekly magazine
 Evropa 2, a commercial radio station in the Czech Republic
 Identity Evropa, an American white nationalist organization

See also 
 Europa (disambiguation)